The 1982–83 USAC Championship Car season consisted of four races, beginning in Springfield, Illinois, on August 14, 1982, and concluding in Speedway, Indiana, on May 29, 1983.  The USAC National Champion and Indianapolis 500 winner was Tom Sneva.

By this  time, the preeminent national championship season was instead sanctioned by CART.

Schedule and results

All races were run on Oval/Speedway courses.

Final points standings

Note: Drivers who failed to enter the Indy 500 were not eligible for points.

References
 
 
 http://media.indycar.com/pdf/2011/IICS_2011_Historical_Record_Book_INT6.pdf  (p. 195-197)

See also
 1983 Indianapolis 500
 1982 CART PPG Indy Car World Series
 1983 CART PPG Indy Car World Series

USAC Championship Car season
USAC Championship Car season
USAC Championship Car